A muskrat (Ondatra zibethicus) is a medium-sized semiaquatic rodent.

Muskrat may also refer to:

Animals
Barbudan muskrat (Megalomys audreyae), an extinct rodent formerly endemic to the island of Barbuda
Martinique muskrat, an extinct rodent formerly endemic to the island of Martinique
Round-tailed muskrat, a semiaquatic rodent native to Florida and Georgia in the United States
Siberian muskrat, a shrew found across northern Asia

Places
Muskrat Dam, Ontario, a Native community in Ontario, Canada
Muskrat Falls, a waterfall in Newfoundland and Labrador, Canada
Muskrat Lake, Ontario, Canada
Muskrat River (Ontario), Canada

Fiction and popular culture
Muskie Muskrat, a character in the animated series Deputy Dawg
Muskrat (G.I. Joe), a character in G.I. Joe: A Real American Hero
’’Muskrat Love’’, a 1973 rock ballad
Muskrat Ramble, a 1926 jazz song
Muskrat Magazine, a Canadian Indigenous arts and culture online magazine

Other
Muskrat French, an ethnic group in Michigan, the United States
Muskrat Root, a type of fragrant herb
Muskrat Scrambler, a roller coaster in New Orleans, the United States
Muskrat v. United States, a 1911 legal case concerning sale of Native American lands
Winnipesaukee Muskrats, a baseball team in New Hampshire, the United States